Slika Hrvatske (Picture Croatian) is a television show which aired on Croatian Radio Television, the national public broadcaster Croatian Republic to Croats Abroad.

Topics 
Emissions Figure Croatian gave the information about the Croatian history, culture and heritage as well as news and entertainment programs to interest Croats abroad.

In the last episode, the show is dealt with themes Health Education in Croatian school ma. Editor-in-Chief Dean Sosa abolished the show, sparking a controversy in the public because the head of Carolina Vidovic Kristo in the program read a letter from a viewer that the introduction of sex education in Croatian schools equated with sexual abuse of children and youth. Featured are clips from the movie The Kinsey Syndrome on Controversial sexologist Alfred Kinsey.

Logo history

References

External links 
Official website 

Croatian television shows
Television channels and stations established in 1990
Croatian Radiotelevision original programming